Qanat-e Kasian (also Romanized as Qanāt-e Kāsīān; also known as Kāsīān, Kāsīān-e Pā’īn, Kāsīān-e Soflá, and Khāsiān) is a village in Beyranvand-e Jonubi Rural District, Bayravand District, Khorramabad County, Lorestan Province, Iran. At the 2006 census, its population was 212, in 44 families.

References 

Towns and villages in Khorramabad County